Lalouvesc is a commune in the Ardèche department in the southern east region of France.

Population

Sights
The Basilica of St. Regis, designed in Byzantine Revival style and completed in 1877, contains the relics of St. John Francis Regis (Jean-François Régis). The windows of the basilica recount the life of the saint and the frescoes in the choir tell the history of pilgrimages to the place. The basilica includes a museum for visitors.

The house where the saint died, on 31 December 1640, is located nearby and has been transformed into a sanctuary.

Personalities
St. Thérèse Couderc, co-founder of the Sisters of the Cenacle, also is buried in Lalouvesc.

See also
Communes of the Ardèche department

References

Communes of Ardèche